The men's heavyweight (91 kg/200.2 lbs) Thai-Boxing division at the W.A.K.O. European Championships 2006 in Skopje was the second heaviest of the male Thai-Boxing tournaments involving eight fighters.  Each of the matches was three rounds of two minutes each and were fought under Thai-Boxing rules.

The tournament gold medal was won by Bulgaria's Kiril Pendjurov who defeated Atanas Stojkovski of Macedonia in the final to win gold.  Alexey Shevtsov from Russia and the Croatian Igor Jurkovic occupied the bronze medal spots.

Yauhen Anhalevich won gold at Budva out in quarter finals

Results

Key

See also
List of WAKO Amateur European Championships
List of WAKO Amateur World Championships
List of male kickboxers

References

External links
 WAKO World Association of Kickboxing Organizations Official Site

W.A.K.O. European Championships 2006 (Skopje)